Crotalidae polyvalent immune fab, sold under the brandname CroFab, is a snake antivenin, indicated for minimal or moderate North American Crotalid (Rattlesnake, Copperhead and Cottonmouth/Water moccasin) snake envenomation.

CroFab is composed of several monovalent Fragment antigen-binding proteins (Fab) derived from the blood of sheep immunized with one of four snake venom: Crotalus atrox (western diamondback rattlesnake), Crotalus adamanteus (Eastern diamondback rattlesnake), Crotalus scutulatus (Mojave rattlesnake), or Agkistrodon piscivorus (Cottonmouth or Water Moccasin).  Each monospecific antivenin is purified from sheep serum, digested with the enzyme papain, and purified further resulting in specific Fab fragments.  The resulting four different Fab preparations are mixed to formulate the final product.

Background 
It was developed by the Venom Immunochemistry, Pharmacology and Emergency Response (VIPER) Institute, University of Arizona, and commercialized by BTG plc (formerly Protherics PLC).  As reported in the Washington Post in July 2015, this was the only commercially available antivenin in the United States for the treatment of venomous snakebites until the release of a competing product, ANAVIP.

Treatment 
Crotalid snakebites can range from mild to life-threatening, depending on the size and type of snake, the amount of venom injected and the location of the bite. This in turn determines the number of vials of CroFab that are required by the patient. Untreated, the snake venom can cause severe pain and tissue damage that can result in the loss of a limb or even death. Prompt (within six hours of snake bite) treatment with CroFab is recommended. 'Fab' refers to Fragment Antigen-Binding, the active mechanism for this antivenom.

Adverse events
The most common adverse events reported in clinical studies were mild or moderate reactions involving the skin and appendages (primarily urticaria, rash, or pruritus), which occurred in 14 out of 42 patients. Three patients experienced a serious adverse event. Two patients had a severe allergic reaction (severe hives and a severe rash and pruritus) following treatment. One patient had a recurrent coagulopathy due to envenomation, which required re-hospitalisation and additional antivenin administration. In clinical trials, recurrent coagulopathy (the return of a coagulation abnormality after it has been successfully treated with antivenin), characterised by decreased fibrinogen, decreased platelets and elevated prothrombin time, occurred in approximately half of the patients studied. Recurrent coagulopathy may persist for one to two weeks or more. One patient discontinued CroFab therapy due to an allergic reaction. Patients with allergies to papain, chymopapain, other papaya extracts or the pineapple enzyme bromelain may also be at risk for an allergic reaction to CroFab.

Cost

Leslie Boyer, Director of the VIPER Institute, who was on the team that developed CroFab, said they were "crestfallen" to discover that the wholesale price of Anascorp, their latest antivenom, was too high to be cost effective, even in the treatment of critically ill children. 

The industry website Fierce Pharma called the product a “drug launch disaster” and “one of the most bizarre marketing tales in the industry.” Boyer said that CroFab, a US drug whose sister product retailed in Mexico at $100, was resulting in bills to Arizona patients of between $7,900 and $39,652 per vial. One person rejected treatment and died because he couldn't afford to pay for it. 

Boyer collected data on the cost of production and marketing, and found that the largest true cost to payers, $4100/vial, was that of the legal, regulatory and hospital activities involved in selling the drug. Clinical trials contributed $300/vial, and 25% of that had been paid for by government grants. Other costs were the same as in Mexico.

References

External links
 RxList: Crotalidae Polyvalent Immune Fab (Ovine)

Antitoxins